Midhurst was a parliamentary borough in Sussex, which elected two Members of Parliament (MPs) to the House of Commons from 1311 until 1832, and then one member from 1832 until 1885, when the constituency was abolished. Before the Great Reform Act of 1832, it was one of the most notorious of England's rotten boroughs.

History
From its foundation in the 14th century until 1832, the borough consisted of part of the parish of Midhurst, a small market town in Sussex. Much of the town as it existed by the 19th century was outside this ancient boundary, but the boundary was in any case academic since the townsfolk had no votes. As a contemporary, writer, Sir George Trevelyan explained in writing about the general election of 1768,
the right of election rested in a few small holdings, on which no human being resided, distinguished among the pastures and the stubble that surrounded them by a large stone set up on end in the middle of each portion.

No doubt these "burgage tenements" had once included houses, but long before the 19th century it was notorious that several of them consisted solely of the marker stones, set in the wall of the landowner's estate. Even compared with most of the other burgage boroughs this was an extreme situation, and during the parliamentary debates on the Reform Bills in 1831 and 1832 the reformers made much play of Midhurst's "niches in a wall" as an example of the abuses they wished to correct.

The natural result of a burgage franchise was to encourage some local landowner to attempt to buy up a majority of the tenements, thereby ensuring absolute control of the choice of both of the members of Parliament, and this happened at an early stage in many other burgage boroughs. In Midhurst, however, there was still no single proprietor by the middle of the 18th century. The most influential figure was The Viscount Montagu, who in 1754 claimed to own 104 burgages, but Sir John Peachey owned 40 and there were more than 70 independent burgage holders. Montagu could usually control matters since he could count on the support of at least half of the independent voters, but for many years there had been an agreement not to force matters, and the Peacheys were allowed one of the two seats.

However, after 1754 Montagu began to buy up the independent burgages; meanwhile Peachey sold his property in the borough to Sir William Peere Williams, who in his turn also tried to increase his holding. At the general election of 1761, the two proprietors seem to have been unsure which would prove to have a majority, and both the Prime Minister and opposition leaders were drawn into the negotiations before a compromise could be reached to avoid a contest. However, when Williams was killed during the capture of Belle Île later the same year, his burgages seem to have been bought by Montagu, who thereafter had a clear field. In 1832 there were still said to be 148 burgage tenements, but only 41 qualified electors, of whom no more than 20 voted. Midhurst was now an undisputed pocket borough: its elections consisted, as Trevelyan related of 1768, in a legal fiction:,
<blockquote>Viscount Montagu ... when an election was in prospect, assigned a few of  [the burgage tenements] to his servants, with instructions to nominate the members and then make back the property to their employer.</blockquote>

In fact by 1761, Montagu's political affairs were being directed by his son, Anthony Browne, who put the borough's seats at the disposal of his parliamentary leader, Lord Holland – Holland used one of them to bring his son, Charles James Fox, into Parliament even though underage. But Holland died before the 1774 election, and Browne (by now the 7th Viscount Montagu) being short of money sold the nomination for both seats to the Treasury in return for a government pension.

After the 7th Viscount's death in 1787, the Montagu property in the borough was sold to the Earl of Egremont for £40,000. The earl used the seat to return two of his younger brothers, Percy and Charles William to the Commons, with Charles only serving one parliament for Midhurst. Egremont in turn sold it to Lord Carrington, who used it more often than not to provide a parliamentary seat for one of his many brothers or nephews.

In 1831, the population of the borough was 1,478, and the first draft of the Reform Bill proposed to abolish it altogether. But after argument the government recognised that it was possible to make a more respectably-sized constituency by expanding the boundaries to bring in the whole of the town and some neighbouring parishes, and Midhurst was reprieved. The expanded borough consisted of the whole of nine parishes and part of ten others, and had a population of 5,627. Nevertheless, Midhurst was permitted to keep only one of its two seats. Under the reformed franchise, its electorate at the election of 1832 was 252; but this was not sufficient to lead to more competitive elections, since the MP was returned unopposed at every election between 1832 and 1868.

Midhurst was eventually abolished as a separate constituency in the boundary changes of 1885, the town being included from that date in the North Western (or Horsham) county division.

 Members of Parliament 
1311–1640

1640–1832

1832–1885

 Election results 
Elections in the 1830s

Poyntz resigned, causing a by-election.

Elections in the 1840s

Seymour resigned by accepting the office of Steward of the Chiltern Hundreds in order to contest a by-election at Antrim, causing a by-election.

Elections in the 1850s
Walpole was appointed Home Secretary, requiring a by-election.

Walpole resigned, causing a by-election.

Warren resigned after being appointed a Master in Lunacy, requiring a by-election.

Elections in the 1860s

Elections in the 1870s

Perceval succeeded to the peerage, becoming Earl of Egmont, and causing a by-election.

Elections in the 1880s

 References 
Robert Beatson, A Chronological Register of Both Houses of Parliament (London: Longman, Hurst, Res & Orme, 1807) 
 Michael Brock, The Great Reform Act (London: Hutchinson, 1973) 
D Brunton & D H Pennington, Members of the Long Parliament (London: George Allen & Unwin, 1954)Cobbett's Parliamentary history of England, from the Norman Conquest in 1066 to the year 1803 (London: Thomas Hansard, 1808) 
F W S Craig, British Parliamentary Election Results 1832–1885 (2nd edition, Aldershot: Parliamentary Research Services, 1989)
 Hansard's Parliamentary Debates, Third Series, Volume 3 (1831) 
 Lewis Namier & John Brooke, The History of Parliament: The House of Commons 1754–1790 (London: HMSO, 1964)
 J. E. Neale, The Elizabethan House of Commons (London: Jonathan Cape, 1949) 
 T. H. B. Oldfield, The Representative History of Great Britain and Ireland (London: Baldwin, Cradock & Joy, 1816)
 J Holladay Philbin, Parliamentary Representation 1832 – England and Wales (New Haven: Yale University Press, 1965)
 Edward Porritt and Annie G Porritt, The Unreformed House of Commons (Cambridge University Press, 1903)
 Frederic A Youngs, jr, Guide to the Local Administrative Units of England, Vol I'' (London: Royal Historical Society, 1979)

Notes

Parliamentary constituencies in South East England (historic)
Constituencies of the Parliament of the United Kingdom established in 1311
Constituencies of the Parliament of the United Kingdom disestablished in 1885